Bi Shengfeng (born January 28, 1989) is a Chinese freestyle wrestler. He competed in the men's freestyle 86 kg event at the 2016 Summer Olympics, in which he was eliminated in the round of 16 by Sharif Sharifov.

References

External links 
 

1989 births
Living people
Chinese male sport wrestlers
Olympic wrestlers of China
Wrestlers at the 2016 Summer Olympics
Wrestlers at the 2018 Asian Games
Asian Games competitors for China
21st-century Chinese people